Crisp was a champion steeplechase horse. He was a bay Thoroughbred gelding that was foaled in 1963 in Australia. In his native country, he won many important jumping races, particularly two-milers, including the Hiskens Steeplechase in 1969 and 1970. So well did he jump, he was nicknamed "The Black Kangaroo". However, Crisp is probably best remembered for his epic contest with Red Rum in the 1973 Grand National in England.

Career in England 
Crisp made his British debut in a handicap race at Wincanton and was allotted . He was ridden by Richard Pitman, who would go on to ride Crisp for the majority of his racing life, including at the Grand National. Crisp won his debut race easily, by 15 lengths.

His first major test was the 1971 Champion Chase at the Cheltenham Festival (now the Queen Mother Champion Chase). Once again, it was an easy victory.

The following year, Crisp's owner decided to run him in the Cheltenham Gold Cup. But the two-miler struggled in the three-and-a-quarter mile race, finishing fifth. Despite the setback, they aimed Crisp at the following year's Grand National, one of the world's most famous steeplechases, at Aintree near Liverpool.

1973 Grand National 
Before the off, Crisp was 9/1 joint-favourite with Red Rum to win the National. However, by the time the runners had reached The Chair, Crisp, who was carrying the top weight of 12 stone (a weight that is now forbidden in the National), had already built up a significant lead and appeared unstoppable. For much of the initial stages, his closest challenger was Bill Shoemark on Grey Sombrero, but that horse fell (fatally) at The Chair, gifting Crisp an even greater lead which had grown to 20 lengths by the end of the first circuit.

Jockey Pitman later recalled that at the Becher's Brook fence on the second circuit, fallen jockey David Nicholson shouted at him, "Richard, you're 33 lengths clear, kick on and you'll win!" At the same time, he heard the Tannoy commentator Michael O'Hehir declare, "And Red Rum is coming out of the pack, Brian Fletcher is kicking him hard!"

At the 30th and final fence, Crisp was still 15 lengths ahead of Red Rum, who was ridden by Fletcher and given 10 stone, 5 lb by the handicapper. However, Crisp was beginning to tire badly on the 494-yard run-in, carrying 23 lb more than his nearest rival. Red Rum made up considerable ground, and two strides from the finishing post he pipped Crisp by three-quarters of a length to win his first of three Grand National titles.

Even in defeat, Crisp had bettered the Grand National completion time by a full 20 seconds, a record that had stood for the 40 previous years.

Despite Red Rum's unprecedented record in Grand Nationals and securing his place in British sporting history, the 1973 race is as much remembered for Crisp's run-in defeat as it was for Red Rum's narrow victory. Veteran commentator Jim McGrath called the battle between Red Rum and Crisp among the highlights of all Grand Nationals and said that Crisp was the unluckiest horse in the race's history.

After the National 
Crisp ran three times in the season after his second-place effort in the 1973 National. After a warm up race over hurdles at Wincanton he won a two and a half mile chase at Newbury beating two mile champion chaser Royal Relief. Then, at Doncaster, he had a match race, at level weights, against his old foe Red Rum. With a twenty three pound weight turnaround from Aintree, Crisp won by eight lengths, but injured himself in doing so, and was retired for the season.

Pitman, his jockey, said in a 2003 interview that following his retirement from racing, Crisp then hunted for the next eight seasons. He died out hunting, and was buried at the entrance of his then-owner's estate. A cherry tree was planted over the grave, which flowers at Grand National time.

See also
 List of historical horses

References

External links
 Crisp's pedigree

1963 racehorse births
1984 racehorse deaths
Cheltenham Festival winners
Racehorses bred in Australia
Racehorses trained in Australia
Racehorses trained in the United Kingdom
Thoroughbred family 16-f
National Hunt racehorses
Australian Racing Hall of Fame horses